Open defecation is the human practice of defecating outside ("in the open") rather than into a toilet. People may choose fields, bushes, forests, ditches, streets, canals, or other open spaces for defecation. They do so either because they do not have a toilet readily accessible or due to traditional cultural practices. The practice is common where sanitation infrastructure and services are not available. Even if toilets are available, behavior change efforts may still be needed to promote the use of toilets. 'Open defecation free' (ODF) is a term used to describe communities that have shifted to using toilets instead of open defecation. This can happen, for example, after community-led total sanitation programs have been implemented.
 
Open defecation can pollute the environment and cause health problems and diseases. High levels of open defecation are linked to high child mortality, poor nutrition, poverty, and large disparities between rich and poor. Ending open defecation is an indicator being used to measure progress towards the Sustainable Development Goal Number 6. Extreme poverty and lack of sanitation are statistically linked. Therefore, eliminating open defecation is thought to be an important part of the effort to eliminate poverty. 
 
 an estimated 673 million people practice open defecation, down from about 892 million people (12 percent of the global population) in 2016. In that year, 76 percent (678 million) of the people practicing open defecation in the world lived in just seven countries.

Overview 
In ancient times, there were more open spaces and less population pressure on land. It was believed that defecating in the open causes little harm when done in areas with low population, forests, or camping-type situations. With development and urbanization, open defecating started becoming a challenge and thereby an important public health issue, and an issue of human dignity. With the increase in population in smaller areas, such as cities and towns, more attention was given to hygiene and health. As a result, there was an increase in global attention towards reducing the practice of open defecation.
 
Open defecation perpetuates the vicious cycle of disease and poverty and is widely regarded as an affront to personal dignity. The countries where open defecation is most widely practiced have the highest numbers of deaths of children under the age of five, as well as high levels of undernutrition, high levels of poverty, and large disparities between people of means and the poor.

Terminology 
The term "open defecation" became widely used in the water, sanitation, and hygiene (WASH) sector from about 2008 onwards. This was due to the publications by the Joint Monitoring Programme for Water Supply and Sanitation (JMP) and the UN International Year of Sanitation. The JMP is a joint program by WHO and UNICEF that was earlier tasked to monitor the water and sanitation targets of the Millennium development goals (MDGs); it is now tasked to monitor Sustainable Development Goal Number 6.
 
For monitoring of the MDG Number 7, two categories were created: 1) improved sanitation and (2) unimproved sanitation. Open defecation falls into the category of unimproved sanitation. This means that people who practice open defecation do not have access to improved sanitation.
 
In 2013 World Toilet Day was celebrated as an official UN day for the first time. The term "open defecation" was used in high-level speeches, that helped to draw global attention to this issue (for example, in the "call to action" on sanitation issued by the Deputy Secretary-General of the United Nations in March 2013).

Open defecation free 
"Open defecation free" (ODF) is a phrase first used in community-led total sanitation (CLTS) programs. ODF has now entered use in other contexts. The original meaning of ODF stated that all community members are using sanitation facilities (such as toilets) instead of going to the open for defecation. This definition was improved and more criteria were added in some countries that have adopted the CLTS approach in their programs to stop the practice of open defecation.
 
The Indian Ministry of Drinking Water and Sanitation in mid-2015 defined ODF as "the termination of fecal-oral transmission, defined by:
 
 No visible feces found in the environment or village and
 Every household as well as public/community institutions using safe technology option for disposal of feces".
 
Here, a "safe technology option" means a toilet that contains feces so that there is no contamination of surface soil, groundwater or surface water; flies or animals do not come in contact with the open feces; no one handles excreta; there is no smell and there are no visible feces around in the environment. This definition is part of the Swachh Bharat Abhiyan (Clean India Campaign).

Reasons 
The reasons for open defecation are varied. It can be a voluntary, semi-voluntary or involuntary choice. Most of the time, a lack of access to a toilet is the reason. However, in some places even people with toilets in their houses prefer to defecate in the open. 
 
A few broad factors that result in the practice of open defecation are listed below.

No toilet 
 Lack of infrastructure: People often lack toilets in their houses, or in the areas where they live.
 Lack of toilets in other places: Lack of toilets in places away from people's houses, such as in schools or in the farms leads the people to defecate in the open. Another example is a lack of public toilets in cities, whether by a reluctance among businesses to allow patrons to use their toilets or limited hours (e.g. if there are no 24-hour businesses in town and someone needs to use the toilet after regular business hours), which can be a big problem for homeless people. 
 Use of toilets for other purposes: In some rural communities, toilets are used for other purposes, such as storing household items, animals, farm products or used as kitchens. In such cases, people go outside to defecate.

Uncomfortable or unsafe toilet 
 
 Poor quality of toilet: Sometimes people have access to a toilet, but the toilet might be broken, or of poor quality – outdoor toilets (pit latrines in particular) typically are devoid of any type of cleaning and reek of odors. Sometimes, toilets are not well lit at all times, especially in areas that lack electricity. Others lack doors or may not have water. Toilets with maggots or cockroaches are also disliked by people and hence, they go out to defecate.
 Risky and unsafe: Some toilets are risky to access. There may be a risk to personal safety due to lack of lights at night, criminals around them, or the presence of animals such as snakes and dogs. Women and children who do not have toilets inside their houses are often found to be scared to access shared or public toilets, especially at night. Accessing toilets that are not located in the house might be a problem for disabled people, especially at night. In some parts of the world, Zambia for example, very young children are discouraged from using pit latines due to the risk of them falling through the open drop-hole. In such cases when there is no other available sanitation facility, children are encouraged to practice open defecation.
 Presence of toilet but not privacy: Some toilets do not have a real door, but have a cloth hung as a door. In some communities, toilets are located in places where women are shy to access them due to the presence of men.
 Lack of water near toilet: Absence of supply of water inside or next to toilets cause people to get water from a distance before using the toilet. This is an additional task and needs extra time.
 Too many people using a toilet: This is especially true in the case of shared or public toilets. If too many people want to use a toilet at the same time, then some people may go outside to defecate instead of waiting. In some cases, people might not be able to wait due to diarrhea (or the result of an Inflammatory Bowel Disease emergency).
 Fear of the pit getting filled: In some places, people are scared that their toilet pits will get filled very fast if all family members use them every day. So they continue to go out to delay the toilet pit filling up. This is especially true in the case of a pit latrine.

Unrelated to toilet infrastructure 
 Lack of awareness: People in some communities do not know about the benefits of using toilets.
 Lack of behavior change: Some communities have toilets, yet people prefer to defecate in the open. In some cases, these toilets are provided by the government or other organizations and the people do not like them, or do not value them. They continue to defecate in the open. Also, older people are often found to defecate in the open and they are hesitant to change their behavior and go inside a closed toilet.
 Prefer being in nature: This happens mostly in less populated or rural areas, where people walk outside early in the morning and go to defecate in the fields or bushes. They prefer to be in nature and the fresh air; instead of defecating in a closed space such as a toilet. There may be a cultural or habitual preference for defecating "in the open air", beside a local river or stream, or even the bush.
 Combining open defecation with other activities: Some people walk early in the morning to look after their farms. Some consider it a social activity, especially women who like to take some time to go out of their homes. While on their way to the fields for open defecation they can talk to other women and take care of their animals.
 Social norms: Open defecation is a part of people's life and daily habits in some regions. For instance, a 2011 survey in rural East Java, Indonesia, found that many men considered the practice ‘normal’, and having distinct benefits such as social interaction and physical comfort. In some cultures, there may be social taboos where a father-in-law may not use the same toilet as a daughter-in-law in the same household. 
 Social or personal preferences: Open defecation is a preferred practice in some parts of the world, with many respondents in a survey from 2015 stating that "open defecation was more pleasurable and desirable than latrine use".
 In some societies, open defecation is an intentional means of fertilization which is widely-used.
 Fecal incontinence: This medical condition can result in abrupt 'emergencies' and not enough time to access a toilet.

Public defecation for other reasons 
In developed countries, open defecation can be due to homelessness. Open defecation in developed areas is also considered to be a part of recreational outdoor activities such as camping in remote areas. It is difficult to estimate how many people practice open defecation in these communities.

Prevalence and trends

Countries with high numbers 
The practice of open defecation is strongly related to poverty and exclusion particularly, in the case of rural areas and informal urban settlements in developing countries. The Joint Monitoring Programme for Water Supply and Sanitation (JMP) of UNICEF and WHO has been collecting data regarding open defecation prevalence worldwide. The figures are segregated by rural and urban areas and by levels of poverty. This program is tasked to monitor progress towards the millennium development goal (MDG) relating to drinking water and sanitation. As open defecation is one example of unimproved sanitation, it is being monitored by JMP for each country, and results are published on a regular basis. The figures on open defecation used to be lumped together with other figures on unimproved sanitation but are collected separately since 2010.
 
The current estimate is that around 673 million people practice open defecation.
 
The number of people practicing open defecation fell from 20 percent in 2000 to 12 percent in 2015. In 2016, the estimate was for 892 million people with no sanitation facility whatsoever and therefore practicing open defecation (in gutters, behind bushes, in open water bodies, etc.). Most people (9 of 10) who practice open defecation live in rural areas, but the vast majority lives in two regions (Central Africa and South Asia). In 2016, seventy-six percent (678 million) of the 892 million people practicing open defecation in the world lived in just seven countries.

Some countries with large numbers of people who openly defecate are listed in the table below.

India 

Open defecation has been an issue in India. A report published by WaterAid  stated that India had the highest number of people without access to basic sanitation despite efforts made by the Government of India under the Swachh Bharat Mission. About 522 million people practiced open defecation in India in 2014, despite having access to a toilet. Many factors contributed to this, ranging from poverty to government corruption.

Since then, through Swachh Bharat, a two-phase program managed by the Indian government, India has constructed around 100 million additional household toilets which would benefit 500 million people in India according to the statistics provided by Indian government (Phase 1: 2014–2019, Phase 2: 2020 to 2025). A campaign to build toilets in urban and rural areas achieved a significant reduction in open defecation between 2014 and 2019. In September 2019, the Bill & Melinda Gates Foundation awarded Indian leader Narendra Modi for his efforts in improving sanitation in the country. According to UNICEF The number of people without a toilet reduced from 550 million to 50 million. There have also been reports of people not using the toilets despite having one, although according to the World Bank, 96% of Indians used the toilets they had.  In October 2019, Modi declared India to be "open defecation free", though this announcement was met with skepticism by experts who cited slowly changing behaviors, maintenance issues, and water access issues as obstacles that continued to block India's goal of being 100% open defecation free.

Although open defecation still continues, it has been reduced by a large amount. With the success of the Swachh Bharat Mission, Modi has to launch Phase 2 from 2020 to 2025. During phase 2 the government will focus on segregation of waste and further eliminating open defecation in the country.

Pakistan 
In 2017, WaterAid report revealed that 79 million people in  Pakistan lacked access to a decent toilet in the country. In 2018, 10% or 22 million people in Pakistan practiced open defecation according to the figures provided by the UNICEF. According to the latest UNICEF report as of 2020, 7% or 15 million people in Pakistan practice open defecation.

United States 
In San Francisco (United States), open defecation complaints for street feces increased fivefold from 2011 to 2018, with 28,084 cases reported. This was mainly due to the rising amount of homelessness in the city. Similar problems were reported in Los Angeles and Miami.

The Mad Pooper was the name given to an unidentified woman who regularly defecated in public places while jogging during summer 2017 in the U.S. city of Colorado Springs.

Impacts

Public health 

The negative public health impacts of open defecation are the same as those described when there is no access to sanitation at all. Open defecation—and lack of sanitation and hygiene in general—is an important factor that cause various diseases; the most common being diarrhea and intestinal worm infections but also typhoid, cholera, hepatitis, polio, trachoma, and others.
 
Adverse health effects of open defecation occur because open defecation results in fecal contamination of the local environment. Consequently, open defecators are repeatedly exposed to many kinds of fecal bacteria like gram-positive Staphylococcus aureus and other fecal pathogens, and this is particularly serious for young children whose immune systems and brains are not yet fully developed.
 
Certain diseases are grouped together under the name of waterborne diseases, which are diseases transmitted via fecal pathogens in water. Open defecation can lead to water pollution when rain flushes feces that are dispersed in the environment into surface water or unprotected wells.
 
Open defecation was found by the WHO in 2014 to be a leading cause of diarrheal death. In 2013, about 2,000 children under the age of five died every day from diarrhea.
 
Young children are particularly vulnerable to ingesting feces of other people that are lying around after open defecation, because young children crawl on the ground, walk barefoot, and put things in their mouths without washing their hands. Feces of farm animals are equally a cause of concern when children are playing in the yard.
 
Those countries where open defecation is most widely practiced have the highest numbers of deaths of children under the age of five, as well as high levels of malnourishment (leading to stunted growth in children), high levels of poverty, and large disparities between rich and poor.
 
Research from India has shown that detrimental health impacts (particularly for early life health) are even more significant from open defecation when the population density is high: "The same amount of open defecation is twice as bad in a place with a high population density average like India versus a low population density average like sub-Saharan Africa."

Open defecation is also badly affecting the health of children and their life quality as it creates health and psychological issues.

Safety of women 
There are strong gender impacts connected with a lack of adequate sanitation. In addition to the universal problems associated with open defecation, having to urinate in the open can also be problematic for females.  The lack of safe, private toilets makes women and girls vulnerable to violence and is an impediment to girls' education. Women are at risk of sexual molestation and rape as they search for places to urinate or defecate that are secluded and private, often during hours of darkness.
 
Lack of privacy has an especially large effect on the safety and sense of dignity of women and girls in developing countries. They face the shame of having to urinate or defecate in public so often wait until nightfall to relieve themselves. They risk being attacked after dark, though it means painfully holding their bladder and bowels all day. Women in developing countries increasingly express fear of assault or rape when having to leave the house after dark. Reports of attacks or harassment near or in toilet facilities, as well as near or in areas where women urinate or defecate openly, are common.

Prevention 
The following joint strategies can enable communities, both rural and peri-urban, to become completely open defecation free and remain so: Sanitation marketing, behavior change communication, and 'enhanced' community-led total sanitation ('CLTS + ’), supplemented by 'nudging'.  
 
There are several drivers used to eradicate open defecation, one of which is behavior change. SaniFOAM (Focus on Opportunity, Ability, and Motivation) is a conceptual framework that was developed specifically to address issues of sanitation and hygiene. Using focus, opportunity, ability and motivation as categories of determinants, SaniFOAM model identifies barriers to latrine adoption while simultaneously serving as a tool for designing, monitoring and evaluating sanitation interventions. The following are some of the key drivers used to fight against open defecation in addition to behavior change:
 
 Political will
 Sanitation solutions that offer a better value than open defecation
 Stronger public sector local service delivery systems
 Creation of the right incentive structures

Integrated initiatives 
Efforts to reduce open defecation are more or less the same as those to achieve the MDG target on access to sanitation. A key aspect is awareness-raising (for example via the UN World Toilet Day at a global level), behavior change campaigns, increasing political will as well as demand for sanitation. Community-Led Total Sanitation (CLTS) campaigns have placed a particular focus on ending open defecation by "triggering" the communities themselves into action.

Simple sanitation technology options 

There are some simple sanitation technology options available to reduce open defecation prevalence if the open defecation behavior is due to not having toilets in the household and shared toilets being too far or too dangerous to reach, e.g., at night.

Toilet bags 
People might already use plastic bags (also called flying toilets) at night to contain their feces. However, a more advanced solution of the plastic toilet bag has been provided by the Swedish company People who are producing the "Peepoo bag", a "personal, single-use, self-sanitizing, fully biodegradable toilet that prevents feces from contaminating the immediate area as well as the surrounding ecosystem". This bag is now being used in humanitarian responses, schools, and urban slums in developing countries.

Bucket toilets and urine diversion 
Bucket toilets are a simple portable toilet option. They can be upgraded in various ways, one of them being urine diversion which can make them similar to urine-diverting dry toilets. Urine diversion can significantly reduce odors from dry toilets. Examples of using this type of toilet to reduce open defecation are the "MoSan" toilet (used in Kenya) or the urine-diverting dry toilet promoted by SOIL in Haiti.

Society and culture

Media 
The mainstream media in some affected countries have recently been picking up on this issue of open defecation, for example, in India and Pakistan.

Legal status 
In certain jurisdictions, open or public defecation is a criminal offense which can be punished with a fine or even imprisonment.

In popular culture 
David Sedaris' essay "Adventures at Poo Corner" dealt with people who openly defecate in commercial businesses.

Open defecation during outdoor activities
Some national parks prohibit open defecation in some areas. If defecating openly, the general advice is to defecate into a dug hole, and cover with soil.

See also 
 EToilet
 Free bleeding
 Public urination
 Sanitation worker
 Spitting

References

External links 

 UN Call to action to end open defecation
 Documents about open defecation in library of Sustainable Sanitation Alliance
 

 

Sanitation
Defecation